We Should Be Together is the sixth studio album by American country music singer Crystal Gayle. Allen Reynolds returned to produce this album, and released on June 19, 1979, it was her sixth and final album for United Artists Records. It peaked at #9 on the Billboard Country Albums chart, with two of its tracks reaching the Top Ten Country Singles chart: "Your Kisses Will" (#7) and "Your Old Cold Shoulder" (#5). The album title comes from the album's last song, written by Allen Reynolds, and which was previously a hit single for Don Williams in 1974.

Track listing

Personnel
Crystal Gayle
Chris Leuzinger, David Kirby, Jimmy Colvard, Ray Edenton, Rod Smarr, Sonny Curtis - guitar
Lloyd Green - steel guitar
Buddy Spicher - fiddle
Bob Moore, Joe Allen, Spady Brannan - bass
Bobby Wood, Dwight Scott, Hargus "Pig" Robbins - keyboards
Charles Cochran - keyboards, string and horn arrangements
Gene Chrisman, Jimmy Isbell, Kenny Malone, Steve Krawczyn - drums
Dennis Good, Don Sheffield - horns
Allen Reynolds, Garth Fundis - backing vocals
The Shelly Kurland Strings - strings

References

1979 albums
Crystal Gayle albums
Albums produced by Allen Reynolds
United Artists Records albums